The 1981–82 Los Angeles Kings season, was the Kings' 15th season in the National Hockey League. It saw the Kings make the playoffs, winning the first round before falling in the second round to the Vancouver Canucks. The first round upset of the heavily favored Edmonton Oilers is considered to be one of the greatest upsets in NHL history.

Offseason
The Kings were moved to the Smythe Division. The Kings now were in a division with western teams.

Regular season

Final standings

Schedule and results

Playoffs
Miracle on Manchester

Player statistics

Awards and records

Transactions
The Kings were involved in the following transactions during the 1981–82 season.

Trades

Free agent signings

Waivers

Draft picks
Los Angeles's draft picks at the 1981 NHL Entry Draft held at the Montreal Forum in Montreal, Quebec.

Farm teams

See also
1981–82 NHL season

References

External links

Los Angeles Kings seasons
Los Angeles Kings
Los Angeles Kings
Los Angeles
Los Angeles